Events in chess during the year 2014:

Major tournaments
World Chess Championship 2014
41st Chess Olympiad
Women's World Chess Championship 2014
2014 European Individual Chess Championship
FIDE Grand Prix 2014–15
FIDE Women's Grand Prix 2013–14
Norway Chess 2014
Shamkir Chess
Sinquefield Cup 2014
Zurich Chess Challenge 2014

 
2014
Chess by year